Bolliger is a surname. Notable people with the surname include:

Manfred Bolliger (born 1962), Swiss wheelchair curler, Paralympian 2006 and 2010
Peter Bolliger (born 1937), Swiss rower
Stefan Bolliger, orienteer

See also
Bolliger & Mabillard, an engineering company